The second season of the American science fiction television series Star Trek, premiered on NBC on September 15, 1967 and concluded on March 29, 1968. It consisted of twenty-six episodes. It features William Shatner as Captain James T. Kirk, Leonard Nimoy as Spock and DeForest Kelley as Leonard McCoy.

Broadcast history
The season originally aired Fridays at 8:30–9:30 pm (EST) on NBC.

Cast

Main

 William Shatner as Captain James T. Kirk: The commanding officer of the USS Enterprise.
 Leonard Nimoy as Commander Spock: The ship's half-human/half-Vulcan science officer and first/executive officer (i.e. second-in-command).
 DeForest Kelley as Lieutenant Commander Dr. Leonard "Bones" McCoy: The ship's chief medical officer.
 James Doohan as Lieutenant Commander Montgomery "Scotty" Scott: The Enterprises chief engineer and second officer (i.e. third-in-command).
 Nichelle Nichols as Lieutenant Uhura: The ship's communications officer.
 George Takei as Lieutenant Sulu: The ship's helmsman.
 Walter Koenig as Ensign Pavel Chekov: A Russian-born navigator introduced in the second-season premiere episode.
 Majel Barrett as Nurse Christine Chapel: The ship's head nurse. Barrett, who played the ship's first officer (number one) in "The Cage," also voiced the ship's computer.

Recurring
 Eddie Paskey as Lt. Leslie

Episodes

<onlyinclude>{{Episode table |background=#589CCD |overall=5 |season=5 |title=22 |director=12 |writer=31 |airdate=12 |prodcode=5 |airdateR= |episodes=

{{Episode list/sublist|Star Trek: The Original Series (season 2)
|EpisodeNumber=44
|EpisodeNumber2=15
|Title=The Trouble with Tribbles
|DirectedBy=Joseph Pevney
|WrittenBy=David Gerrold
|OriginalAirDate=
|ProdCode=42
|ShortSummary=Tribbles – purring, fluffy, and fertile creatures – disrupt the exploitation of a disputed planet between the Klingon Empire and the Federation. The Enterprise responds to a priority 1 distress signal from Space Station K7 on the edge of the Neutral Zone and close to Sherman's Planet. Mr. Baris asks Kirk to provide protection to the storage facility on the space station to preserve an improved grain that will help the Federation to gain control of Sherman's Planet and prevent the Klingons from capturing it. Kirk sanctions the security guard and also gives shore leave to the crew aboard the Enterprise. Uhura and Chekov find an interesting creature called a tribble on the station and bring it aboard the Enterprise. Tribbles begin to reproduce exponentially and spread everywhere on the Enterprise. A Klingon ship also reaches the K7 facility for shore leave and Kirk allows it under the Enterprise'''s protection. Tribbles begin to enter the vent systems of the Enterprise and Space Station K7, destroying the crop. Later it is revealed that the crop was poisoned by a Klingon spy aboard the space station. The poison also killed the Tribbles that ate the grain. Kirk finds the spy and Scotty finds a way to get rid of the tribbles from the Enterprise.
|LineColor=589CCD
}}

}}
</onlyinclude>

Home media
The season was released on DVD and Blu-ray by Paramount Home Entertainment. There is earlier version and a remastered version.

There was DVD set release in 2004, and later a remastered version was also released on DVD, which featured some updated special effects in some scenes as well as re-processed color, etc.

The Remastered DVD set also included special features for 'Tribbles', including the episodes "Trials and Tribblations" from Star Trek: Deep Space Nine and "More Tribbles, More Troubles" from Star Trek: The Animated Series.Star Trek: The Remastered Series Seasons 1, 2 & 3 review James Hunt. 20 May 2009. Retrieved 7 August 2019. The Remastered DVD set included 8 DVD discs.

Reception
In 2019, CBR rated Season 2 of Star Trek (original series) as the second best season of all Star Trek'' seasons up to that time, and the best season of the original's three seasons.

See also
 List of Star Trek: The Original Series episodes – all episodes listed in chronological order, no summaries
 Star Trek: The Original Series (season 1) – listing of first-season episodes, summarized with links
 Star Trek: The Original Series (season 3) – listing of third-season episodes, summarized with links

References

Star Trek: The Original Series
1967 American television seasons
Original Series
1968 American television seasons